Stenopseustes is a genus of beetles in the family Cerambycidae, containing the following species:

 Stenopseustes aeger Bates, 1873
 Stenopseustes gibbicollis Fisher, 1947
 Stenopseustes sericinus Bates, 1880

References

Rhinotragini